1st Rabochiy Poselok is a rural locality (a settlement) in Vnukovskoye Settlement of Novomoskovsky Administrative Okrug, Russia. The  population was 8 as of 2010.

Geography 
The village is located 500 m south-west from Gubkino village.

Streets 
There are no streets with titles.

References 

Rural localities in Moscow (federal city)
Novomoskovsky Administrative Okrug